The men's doubles tournament at the 1985 French Open was held from 27 May until 9 June 1985 on the outdoor clay courts at the Stade Roland Garros in Paris, France. Mark Edmondson and Kim Warwick won the title, defeating Shlomo Glickstein and Hans Simonsson in the final.

Seeds

Draw

Finals

Top half

Section 1

Section 2

Bottom half

Section 3

Section 4

External links
 Association of Tennis Professionals (ATP) – main draw
1985 French Open – Men's draws and results at the International Tennis Federation

Men's Doubles
French Open by year – Men's doubles